The Hotel Kempsford is a historic apartment house at 72 Walnut Street in Brookline, Massachusetts.  The four story brick building was designed by Brookline architect Obed Smith and built in 1875 for Eben Wright, a real estate developer who also built the nearby Hotel Adelaide.  This building is a high-quality local example of Victorian Gothic architecture in brick.  The apartment units inside are also in a distinctive two-story plan, one of the earliest examples of the type.

The building was listed on the National Register of Historic Places in 1985.

See also
National Register of Historic Places listings in Brookline, Massachusetts

References

Gothic Revival architecture in Massachusetts
Residential buildings completed in 1875
Buildings and structures in Brookline, Massachusetts
National Register of Historic Places in Brookline, Massachusetts